Norman H. Phinney (August 7, 1860 – December 11, 1919) was a businessman and political figure in Nova Scotia, Canada. He represented Annapolis County in the Nova Scotia House of Assembly from 1911 to 1916 as a Liberal member.

Career 
He was born in Lawrencetown, Annapolis County, Nova Scotia, the son of Elijah Phinney. He established a company there which sold pianos, organs, phonographs and sewing machines, among other things.

Family 
In 1874, he married Jesse Wheelock. Phinney married Emma M. Bishop (née Fitzrandolph) in 1901 after the death of his first wife.

References 

 

1850 births
1919 deaths
Nova Scotia Liberal Party MLAs